Ivan Sabolić (24 August 1921 – 25 June 1986) was a Yugoslavian sculptor, professor and dean of the Academy of Fine Arts Zagreb,  head master of the workshop in 1975.

Sabolić was born in Peteranec. Self-taught, he made his first works in clay, including portraits of his father, mother and grandfather, which make up his oldest surviving works. Sabolić was a member of the postwar generation of sculptors who from the mid-20th century sought to escape from the strict framework of socialist realism and commissioned art, and remain faithful to the Croatian tradition.

He made a monument of "Three Fists" on a hill in Bubanj Memorial Park, Palilula municipality of Niš. It opened on October 14, 1963.

Ivan Sabolić died in Zagreb.

References

1921 births
1986 deaths
People from Peteranec
Croatian sculptors
Yugoslav sculptors